Malach is a union council of Abbottabad District in Khyber-Pakhtunkhwa province of Pakistan. According to the 2017 Census of Pakistan, the population is 12,861.

Subdivisions
Keri Sarafali
Malachh
Pasala

References

Union councils of Abbottabad District